Jean L'Hôte (13 January 1929 – 28 April 1985) was a French screenwriter and film director. He worked on 21 films between 1958 and 1985.

Selected filmography
 Mon Oncle (1958)
 Le Prussien (1971)

References

External links

1929 births
1985 deaths
French male screenwriters
20th-century French screenwriters
French film directors
20th-century French male writers